Canary Row is a 1949 Warner Bros. Merrie Melodies short directed by Friz Freleng and written by Tedd Pierce. The short was released on October 7, 1950, and stars Tweety and Sylvester.

This is the first Sylvester and Tweety cartoon to feature Granny. The title of this cartoon is a play on words from Cannery Row; Sylvester later starred in another cartoon with a similar title, Cannery Woe.

Plot

From his room in an 8-story building belonging to the “Bird-Watchers' Society”, Sylvester employs binoculars to focus on the window opposite him, containing Tweety's cage. Tweety does the same (we see Sylvester's dark green eyes magnified enough to see the blood vessels in them, then Tweety's blue eyes—but lacking blood vessels). Tweety puts his binoculars down and says his usual catchphrase, “I tawt I taw a puddy tat!” Then he replaces his binoculars to confirm and, indeed, “I DID! I DID taw a puddy tat!” Sylvester jumps for joy and runs to the building Tweety is in (the 10-story Broken Arms Apartment Building), but fails to notice the sign banning cats and dogs from the building. This results in a confrontation with the guard just inside the door, who kicks Sylvester out.

Next, Sylvester climbs up the drainpipe of the Broken Arms Apartment Building while Tweety sings the song "When Irish Eyes are Smiling". Behind Tweety and off-camera, Sylvester swings a paw in metronome rhythm to his "berry's" song. Only then does Tweety realize that Sylvester is watching him. He calls for help and jumps out of his cage; Sylvester chases him through the room. However, Tweety's owner, Granny is ready for him. She throws him out the window and, looking down on him, snarls: “Yeah that'll teach ya! Next time I'll give you what for!” Tweety joins in the scolding: “Bad ol' puddy tat!”

Sylvester paces around the alleyway, then gets an idea: to climb up in the drainpipe. Instead of getting scared again, Tweety now drops a bowling ball into the drainpipe. The heavy ball collides with Sylvester – and he swallows it! He frantically attempts to stop himself from rolling into “Champin's Bowling Alley” (a reference to animator Ken Champin), but to no avail. Sounds of bowling pins dropping emanate from said building.

Now Sylvester attempts to come up with a new plan for consumption of Tweety. He then notices a street busker with a monkey across the street. He slips across the street and then, after luring the monkey away from his master with a banana, hits him (off-screen) in the head and manages to pass himself off as said monkey to the busker. Tweety isn't fooled, though, realizing that “OH! Here tum dat puddy tat adain!” Sylvester enters Granny's room chasing Tweety, but has to stop running after him outright when Granny notices him. He now tries (without much success) to surreptitiously look for and eat Tweety. His attempt to pass himself off as a monkey is ruined when Granny gives him a penny and he can't resist tipping his hat politely to her. Granny smacks him in the head with an umbrella and then exposes that she was actually fully aware that he was a deliberately intruding cat who wanted to eat her canary rather than a legitimately in-business monkey whose busker master was trying to make a living. Sylvester, who now has a lump on his head, staggers out of the room, tipping his hat at the angry Granny on his way out.

Next, Sylvester manages to gain access to the desk clerk's office undetected (how he did so is unknown) and hears the telephone ring. Frustratingly, the desk clerk picks it up, but is professionally calm and polite when talking to Granny. Eavesdropping on them, Sylvester hears that Granny is checking out of Room 158, and that she wants someone to pick up Tweety and her luggage.

That gives Sylvester the idea he wants: cut to a shot of Sylvester knocking on Granny's door. Granny opens it a crack and asks Sylvester what he's doing, to which Sylvester replies in his lisping voice, “Your bags, Madame.” Granny answers, “OK, they're behind the door. I'll see you in the lobby.” Sylvester enters Room 158 and picks up Granny's suitcases and Tweety's cage. He carries them all out into the hall, then discards the suitcase and carries the cage down the stairs to the rear of the apartment building. There, he walks into the alley and opens the cage, expecting to enjoy Tweety – but Granny is in the cage! She hits Sylvester with her umbrella several times in rapid succession.

Next, Sylvester drags a box, a plank and a 500-pound weight to the point at the base of the apartment building that is in a direct vertical line with Tweety's window. He supports the plank with the box in the middle, stands on one end of the plank and heaves the weight onto the other end. This propels him up to Tweety's level and enables him to snatch the tiny bird. However, as he runs off, the weight lands hard on his head, freeing Tweety.

Sylvester next tries to swing over to Tweety's window (Granny had obviously opted to stay), and uses all manner of scientific methods to ensure that he doesn't let Tweety slip by him again. However, he misjudges something that forces him to crash into the wall next to the drainpipe. Tweety remarks, "That puddy tat's gonna Hurt himself is he's not more careful!"

Finally, Sylvester's pacing stops quite abruptly when he notices the electric air cable wires over his head. He crosses the street, climbs the supporting pole and walks the wires across to the Broken Arms Apartment Building. However, Sylvester has to get out of the way when he hears the bell ringing to signal the approach of a trolley. His feet aren't quick enough to evade the trolley, and he is electrocuted several times as the trolley pursues him! The driver is shown to be: Tweety, who again says, “I tawt I taw a puddy tat!” and Granny, who is sitting next to him, agrees with him, “You did, you DID! You DID taw a putty tat!”. The cartoon irises out as the trolley shocks Sylvester three times and the film ends.

Production 

Mel Blanc's voice for Tweety (except when singing) was edited to an extra higher pitch than usual for this cartoon, but would go back to its regular edited pitch in Tweety's next short, Putty Tat Trouble. This would happen again in the 1952 short A Bird In A Guilty Cage, and stayed that way from 1953 to early 1954 but would return to the original edited pitch again in Muzzle Tough.

In linguistics 
Sometime before fall 1980, linguistics researchers David McNeill and Elena Levy selected Canary Row as a test stimulus for a study on nonverbal communication. The film has since become a widely used standard stimulus in linguistics research on how people communicate when retelling stories to others.

References

External links

 
 

1950 films
1950 short films
1950 comedy films
1950 animated films
1950s children's comedy films
1950s children's animated films
1950s English-language films
1950s Warner Bros. animated short films
American children's animated comedy films
American animated short films
American slapstick comedy films
Surreal comedy films
Merrie Melodies short films
Sylvester the Cat films
Tweety films
Animated films about monkeys
Films about pets
Animated films set in San Francisco
Films set in apartment buildings
Films set in hotels
Films set in 1950
Short films directed by Friz Freleng
Films scored by Carl Stalling
Warner Bros. Cartoons animated short films